Peter Van de Velde may refer to:

Pedro Campaña (1503–1586), Flemish painter
Peter van de Velde (1634–after 1723), Flemish marine painter